Eide is a Norwegian surname. Notable people with the surname include:

Anders Eide (born 1971), Norwegian cross-country skier
Asbjørn Eide (born 1933), Norwegian human rights scholar
Atle Eide (born 1957), Norwegian businessman
Carl-Michael Eide (born 1974), Norwegian black metal musician
Egil Eide (1868–1946), Norwegian silent film actor and director
Espen Barth Eide (born 1964), Norway's Minister of Defense
Espen Sommer Eide (born 1972), Norwegian composer and musician
Gunn-Vivian Eide (born 1964), Norwegian politician for the Liberal Party
Hans Engelsen Eide (born 1965), Norwegian freestyle skier
Helge Eide (born 1954), Norwegian businessman
Helge Eide (politician) (born 1964), Norwegian politician for the Christian Democratic Party
Ingrid Eide (born 1933), Norwegian sociologist, UN official, and politician for the Labour Party
Johannes Eide (born 1937), Norwegian businessman
Kai Eide (born 1949), Norwegian diplomat
Kjell Eide (1925–2011), Norwegian civil servant
Kristin Eide, Norwegian handball player
Linda Eide (born 10 February 1969), Norwegian television and radio presenter
Lorentz Eide (1924–1992), American soldier and Olympic 
Mary Eide (1924–2013), Norwegian politician for the Labour Party
Petter Eide (born 1959), Norwegian activist
Reidar Eide (1940–1999), Norwegian motorcycle speedway rider
Rigmor Andersen Eide (born 1954), Norwegian politician for the Christian Democratic Party 
Tracey Eide (born 1954), Democratic member of the Washington State (USA) Senate
Vigleik Eide (1933–2011), Norwegian diplomat and military officer

Norwegian-language surnames